Constance Ray  (born July 10, 1956) is an American actress and playwright. Among her highest-profile  appearances are Thank You for Smoking (2006) and Stuart Little (1999), and the television drama ER (1997). She also appeared in Ice Princess (2005) and on George Lopez (2002).

Biography

Constance Ray was one of three children born to Betty Jean (Edmonds) and Shelton Ray and raised on the family's dairy farm in Orange County, North Carolina. At the age of ten, Ray wrote a play with her brother Lester for a 4-H club talent show that went on to win at county and district competitions. She went on to study dance at East Carolina University and earned a Master of Fine Arts at Ohio University.

Ray wrote the bluegrass gospel musicals Smoke On The Mountain, which opened off-Broadway in 1990, Sanders Family Christmas (1999), and Smoke on the Mountain Homecoming (2006), three of the most produced musicals in the United States for the last 20 years.

Filmography

Film

Television

Theater

References

External links
 

1956 births
Actresses from North Carolina
American film actresses
American television actresses
East Carolina University alumni
People from Hillsborough, North Carolina
Living people
21st-century American women